Magda (Bîrsan) Popeanu (born May 20, 1956) is a Canadian politician. 

She was born in Târgoviște, Romania, and graduated from "Alexandru Ioan Cuza" High School in Iași. After getting a BA in Electronics Engineering from Gheorghe Asachi Technical University of Iași in 1980 she worked in computer sciences. Popeanu was a 1989 Romanian revolutionary. She immigrated to Canada in 1992. She taught computer engineering for Commission scolaire Marguerite-Bourgeoys for many years.

Popeanu was a candidate for Projet Montréal in the 2005 and 2009 elections in Côte-des-Neiges district where she obtained 16% and 31.6% of the vote, respectively. Popeanu has served as the president of Projet Montréal since 2006. Popeanu currently serves as a member of Montreal City Council, representing the district of Côte-des-Neiges in the borough of Côte-des-Neiges–Notre-Dame-de-Grâce. Popeanu has served on Montreal city council since 2013.

References

1956 births
People from Târgoviște
Living people
Gheorghe Asachi Technical University of Iași alumni
Romanian revolutionaries
Romanian activists
Romanian women activists
Romanian emigrants to Canada
Montreal city councillors
Women in Quebec politics
Women municipal councillors in Canada
21st-century Canadian politicians
21st-century Canadian women politicians